The 1904 Colorado gubernatorial election was held on November 8, 1904. 

According to the tabulated results, Democratic nominee Alva Adams defeated incumbent Republican James Hamilton Peabody with 50.64% of the vote. Peabody successfully contested the results based on allegations of Democratic voter fraud in Denver and was installed as Governor on March 17, 1905 after Alva Adams had served for over two months. Peabody, who also faced election fraud allegations against himself, resigned the same day. Republican Lieutenant Governor Jesse Fuller McDonald then ascended to the governorship. This episode caused Colorado to have three different Governors within a time span of 24 hours.

General election

Candidates
Major party candidates
Alva Adams, Democratic
James Hamilton Peabody, Republican

Other candidates
Robert A. N. Wilson, Prohibition
Andrew H. Floaten, Socialist
James Merwin, People's
J. A. Knight, Socialist Labor

Results

References

1904
Colorado
Gubernatorial